Dark Floors – The Lordi Motion Picture is a 2008 English-language Finnish horror film that features members of the hard rock band Lordi playing the monsters. Band frontman Mr Lordi also designed the film's logo. The film was released in February 2008 and stars William Hope, Leon Herbert, Philip Bretherton, Ronald Pickup, and Skye Bennett. A new Lordi song, Beast Loose in Paradise, is featured in the end credits of the film.

Plot 

A young, autistic girl at a hospital holds the key to defeating other-dimensional monsters that seek to kill everyone.

Cast

Production

Budget 
The full budget of Dark Floors reached $4.3 million (U.S.), making it one of the most expensive films made in Finland. Most of the budget was spent on special effects design, set construction, and a large marketing campaign, along with the post-production process.

Scenery and special effects 
The sets were the largest constructed in Finland, taking up 1,700 square metres during the basement carpark scene. It was originally planned to shoot the film on location in the Baltics, but Oulu was chosen instead, with special effects used to replicate a city when necessary. The production team visited hospitals to research the workings of an X-ray, thereby adding both credibility and authenticity to the CGI-rendered X-rays shown. When principal photography was completed, the extended post-production phase was launched, including the insertion of Awa's ghostly appearance.

Release

Marketing 
The film was originally intended to premiere in 2007, at the Eurovision song contest in Helsinki, whose opening number, featuring Lordi, with a performance of "Hard Rock Hallelujah". Unfortunately, the team could not finish their tasks in time; moreover, Lordi were already putting final touches on their Bringing Back the Balls to Europe tour. Post-production was therefore expanded into May of the same year, and was eventually rescheduled to December.

The press conference was held at the Cannes Film Festival the weekend of 19 and 20 May 2007. Lordi appeared personally, as did director Pete Riski, producer Markus Selin, and virtually all the leading actors. All involved responded to questions, and shared unusual anecdotes on making the film.

Dark Floors was slowly 'leaked' by way of a marketing campaign, and the press were permitted to witness the production of Kita's lift scene, although everything else was kept under wraps.

Home media 
The film was released in the United Kingdom on DVD (region 2) by Metrodome Distribution on 20 April 2009. The release includes several extra features, listed as "Behind the Scenes of Dark Floors", "Cast & Crew Interviews", and "Dark Floors World Premiere featurette including Q&A with Lordi, the cast and crew and a live Lordi performance". The film is rated 18+ by the BBFC for "strong bloody violence and horror".

Reception 
Derek Elley of Variety called it "a cultural oddity with an OK concept" that will perform well on video. Bloody Disgusting rated it 3/5 stars, and wrote, "Even though it's plastered in heavy clichés and predictable plot-twists, has no sense of mood or tempo, and features some of the least scary monsters ever to grace the silver screen, it's still remarkably entertaining."  Joshua Siebalt of Dread Central rated it 2.5/5 stars and called it a boring, uninspired film that is "not nearly as fun or cool as it should've been".  Todd Brown of Twitch Film called it "a tightly plotted, exceptionally well shot thrill ride".  Ian Jane of DVD Talk rated it 1.5/5 stars and wrote that the film does not exploit its visuals or interesting premise.  David Johnson of DVD Verdict wrote, "Straight out of Finland—ghosts, demons, autism, and heavy metal combine for one of the more interesting and out-there haunted hospital movies to come around in quite some time."

References

External links 

 Solar Films's Dark Floors site
 The Finnish Film Foundation's Dark Floors page
 Nordisk Film International Sales: Dark Floors
 Kaleva newspaper's Dark Floors gallery
 
 
 
 Lordi.fi – band website

2008 films
2008 horror films
2000s monster movies
Films about autism
Finnish horror films
English-language Finnish films
2000s supernatural horror films
Finnish zombie films
2000s English-language films